William Calman Grahame, known as W. C. Grahame,  (3 February 1863 – 15 September 1945) was a member of the New South Wales Legislative Assembly, representing Wickham from 1907 to 1920. Grahame served as Minister for Agriculture under Premier William Holman in both the Labor ministry and Nationalist ministry. Wickham was abolished in 1920, with the introduction of proportional representation and combined with Newcastle and Grahame unsuccessfully stood as an independent at the 1920 election for Newcastle.

He was also the first mayor of the recreated Municipality of Gosford, from 1936 to 1944. Central Coast Stadium (Bluetongue Stadium) in Gosford was formerly known as Grahame Park, named after him in 1939.

References

 

1863 births
1945 deaths
Members of the New South Wales Legislative Assembly
Nationalist Party of Australia members of the Parliament of New South Wales
Australian Labor Party members of the Parliament of New South Wales
Shire Presidents and Mayors of Gosford